Paolo Pellegrini (1597 – April 1683) was a Roman Catholic prelate who served as Bishop of Capri (1641–1683).

Biography
Paolo Pellegrini was born in Naples, Italy in 1597.
On 18 March 1641, he was appointed during the papacy of Pope Urban VIII as Bishop of Capri.
On 2 April 1641, he was consecrated bishop by Benedetto Ubaldi, Cardinal-Deacon of Santi Vito, Modesto e Crescenzia, with Luigi Leonardo Mocenigo, Archbishop of Candia, and Filippo Cansacchi, Bishop of Gravina di Puglia, serving as co-consecrators. 
He served as Bishop of Capri until his death in April 1683.

References

External links and additional sources
 (for Chronology of Bishops)
 (for Chronology of Bishops)

17th-century Italian Roman Catholic bishops
Bishops appointed by Pope Urban VIII
1597 births
1683 deaths